This is a comprehensive list of the butterflies recorded in Saint Petersburg and Leningrad Oblast, Russia.

Hesperiidae

Pyrginae
Erynnis tages (Linnaeus, 1758)
Pyrgus alveus (Hübner, 1803)
Pyrgus malvae (Linnaeus, 1758)
Pyrgus serratulae (Rambur, 1839)

Hesperiinae
Carterocephalus palaemon (Pallas, 1771)
Carterocephalus silvicola (Meigen, 1830)
Hesperia comma (Linnaeus, 1758)
Heteropterus morpheus (Pallas, 1771)
Ochlodes sylvanus (Esper, 1777)
Thymelicus lineola (Ochsenheimer, 1808)
Thymelicus sylvestris (Poda, 1761)

Papilionidae

Papilioninae
Papilio machaon (Linnaeus, 1758)

Parnassiinae
Parnassius apollo (Linnaeus, 1758)
Parnassius mnemosyne (Linnaeus, 1758)

Pieridae

Pierinae
Anthocharis cardamines (Linnaeus, 1758)
Aporia crataegi (Linnaeus, 1758)
Pieris brassicae (Linnaeus, 1758)
Pieris napi (Linnaeus, 1758)
Pieris rapae (Linnaeus, 1758)
Pontia edusa (Fabricius, 1777)

Dismorphiinae
Leptidea sinapis (Linnaeus, 1758)

Coliadinae
Colias croceus (Geoffroy in Fourcroy, 1785)
Colias hyale (Linnaeus, 1758)
Colias palaeno (Linnaeus, 1758)
Gonepteryx rhamni (Linnaeus, 1758)

Nymphalidae

Nymphalinae
Aglais io (Linnaeus, 1758)
Aglais urticae (Linnaeus, 1758)
Araschnia levana (Linnaeus, 1758)
Euphydryas aurinia (Rottemburg, 1775)
Euphydryas maturna (Linnaeus, 1758)
Melitaea athalia (Rottemburg, 1775)
Melitaea aurelia (Nickerl, 1850)
Melitaea cinxia (Linnaeus, 1758)
Melitaea diamina (Lang, 1789)
Melitaea didyma (Esper, 1779)
Melitaea phoebe (Denis & Schiffermüller, 1775)
Nymphalis antiopa (Linnaeus, 1758)
Nymphalis polychloros (Linnaeus, 1758)
Nymphalis vaualbum (Denis & Schiffermüller, 1775)
Nymphalis xanthomelas (Esper, 1781)
Polygonia c-album (Linnaeus, 1758)
Vanessa atalanta (Linnaeus, 1758)
Vanessa cardui (Linnaeus, 1758)

Limenitidinae
Limenitis camilla (Linnaeus, 1763)
Limenitis populi (Linnaeus, 1758)

Apaturinae
Apatura ilia (Denis & Shiffermuller, 1775)
Apatura iris (Linnaeus, 1758)

Heliconiinae
Argynnis laodice (Pallas, 1771)
Argynnis paphia (Linnaeus, 1758)
Boloria aquilonaris (Stichel, 1908)
Boloria dia (Linnaeus, 1767)
Boloria eunomia (Esper, 1799)
Boloria euphrosyne (Linnaeus, 1758)
Boloria freija (Becklin in Thunberg, 1791)
Boloria frigga (Becklin in Thunberg, 1791)
Boloria selene (Denis & Schiffermuller, 1775)
Boloria thore (Hübner, 1803)
Boloria titania (Esper, 1793)
Brenthis ino (Rottemburg, 1775)
Fabriciana adippe (Denis & Schiffermüller, 1775)
Fabriciana niobe (Linnaeus, 1758)
Issoria lathonia (Linnaeus, 1758)
Speyeria aglaja (Linnaeus, 1758)

Satyrinae
Aphantopus hyperantus (Linnaeus, 1758)
Coenonympha glycerion (Borkhausen, 1788)
Coenonympha hero (Linnaeus, 1761)
Coenonympha pamphilus (Linnaeus, 1758)
Coenonympha tullia (Müller, 1764)
Erebia embla (Becklin in Thunberg, 1791)
Erebia ligea (Linnaeus, 1758)
Hipparchia semele (Linnaeus, 1758)
Hyponephele lycaon (Rottemburg, 1775)
Lasiommata maera (Linnaeus, 1758)
Lasiommata megera (Linnaeus, 1767)
Lasiommata petropolitana (Fabricius, 1787)
Lopinga achine (Scopoli, 1763)
Maniola jurtina (Linnaeus, 1758)
Oeneis jutta (Hübner, 1806)
Pararge aegeria (Linnaeus, 1758)

Lycaenidae

Theclinae
Callophrys rubi (Linnaeus, 1758)
Neozephyrus quercus (Linnaeus, 1758)
Satyrium pruni (Linnaeus, 1758)
Satyrium w-album (Knoch, 1782)
Thecla betulae (Linnaeus, 1758)

Lycaeninae
Lycaena alciphron (Rottemburg, 1775)
Lycaena dispar (Haworth, 1803)
Lycaena helle (Denis & Schiffermuller, 1775)
Lycaena hippothoe (Linnaeus, 1761)
Lycaena phlaeas (Linnaeus, 1761)
Lycaena virgaureae (Linnaeus, 1758)

Polyommatinae
Agriades optilete (Knoch, 1781)
Aricia artaxerxes allous (Fabricius, 1775)
Celastrina argiolus (Linnaeus, 1758)
Cupido alcetas (Hoffmannsegg, 1804)
Cupido argiades (Pallas, 1771)
Cupido minimus (Fuessly, 1775)
Cyaniris semiargus (Rottemburg, 1775)
Eumedonia eumedon (Esper, 1780)
Glaucopsyche alexis (Poda, 1761)
Phengaris alcon (Denis & Schiffermuller, 1775)
Phengaris arion (Linnaeus, 1758)
Plebejus argus (Linnaeus, 1758)
Plebejus idas (Linnaeus, 1761)
Polyommatus amandus (Schneider, 1792)
Polyommatus damon (Denis & Schiffermuller, 1775)
Polyommatus icarus (Rottemburg, 1775)
Pseudophilotes vicrama (Moore, 1865)

See also
List of butterflies of Russia

Sources
Цветков Е.В. Булавоусые чешуекрылые Санкт-Петербурга и Ленинградской области. Compact Disc, 2005.

Lists of butterflies by location
Butterflies of Saint Petersburg and Leningrad Oblast
Saint Petersburg
Leningrad Oblast
Butterflies
Butterflies